Final Fantasy is a media franchise created by Hironobu Sakaguchi and owned by Square Enix that includes video games, motion pictures, and other merchandise. There have been a number of compilation albums of Final Fantasy music produced by Square Enix, as well as several albums produced by outside groups, both officially and unofficially licensed. These albums include music directly from the games, as well as arrangements covering a variety of styles, such as orchestral, piano, vocal, and techno. Square Enix produced the first album, Final Fantasy 1987–1994, in 1994. Since then, over 40 albums have been produced, both by Square Enix and, beginning with the 2000 The Best of Final Fantasy 1994–1999: A Musical Tribute, outside groups.

Albums

See also
 List of Final Fantasy media

References

External links
 Square Enix's official music site

Final Fantasy music
Video game music discographies
Lists of compilation albums